This is a list of administrators and governors of Plateau State Nigeria.

See also
States of Nigeria
List of state governors of Nigeria

References

Plateau
Governors